Darlong (Dalong) is one of the  Kuki-Chin language of India.

It is spoken by the Darlong people of Tripura.

See also
 Darlong people
 Darchawi

References

Kuki-Chin languages
Languages of Tripura
Sino-Tibetan languages